United Party is a term used various political parties:

United Australia Party
United Party (British Virgin Islands)
United Party of Canada
United Party of Canada (2009)
United Party of Canada (2018)
United Party (Gambia)
United Party (Ghana)
United Party of Jamaica
United Party (Kenya)
United Party (New Zealand)
United Party (Papua New Guinea)
United Party of Retirees and Pensioners, Portugal
United Party (South Africa)
United Party (Southern Rhodesia)
United Party (Zambia)
United Party for National Development, Zambia

See also
People's United Party
United Progressive Party (disambiguation)
United Workers' Party (disambiguation)
National Unity Party (disambiguation)